Antani is a surname that is most common in India. It may refer to:

Given name
Antani Ivanov (born 1999), Bulgarian swimmer

Surname
 M. D. Antani (born 1954), Indian police officer
 Niraj Antani (born 1991), American politician
 Vinesh Antani (born 1946), Indian  writer

See also
 
Anjani (disambiguation)
Antai (disambiguation)

Notes

Indian surnames